The 1926–27 Montreal Canadiens season was the team's 18th season, and tenth in the National Hockey League (NHL). The team rebounded from its last place finish to place second in the Canadian Division and qualify for the playoffs. The Canadiens defeated the rival Maroons in a two-game series before losing to the eventual Stanley Cup winner Ottawa Senators in the semi-finals.

Regular season

The Canadiens, last place finishers in 1925–26, signed three players from the Western Hockey League. The team solved its goal-tending woes by signing George Hainsworth from Saskatoon, whom Georges Vezina had designated to be his successor. They further strengthened their team by signing Herb Gardiner from Calgary for defence and adding Art Gagne from Edmonton to the forwards.

The Canadiens moved into the Montreal Forum permanently this season. The club's first game was on November 18, 1926, against Ottawa, lost 2–1. The Canadiens won eleven games in a row from February 24 until March 24. The surge enabled the Canadiens to finish second in the Canadian Division to Ottawa.

Final standings

Record vs. opponents

Schedule and results

Playoffs
In a "Battle of Montreal" quarter-final, the Canadiens defeated the Maroons in a close two-game total-goals series 2–1. The Canadiens next took on the first place Ottawa Senators in the semi-finals. The eventual Stanley Cup champions defeated the Canadiens 5–1 in a two-game total-goals series.

Montreal Canadiens vs. Montreal Maroons

Montreal Canadiens win total-goals series 2–1

Ottawa Senators vs. Montreal Canadiens

Ottawa wins total-goals series 5–1

Player statistics

Regular season
Scoring

Goaltending

Playoffs
Scoring

Goaltending

Awards
 Vezina Memorial Trophy – awarded to George Hainsworth

Transactions
 January 17, 1927 – Billy Boucher traded to Boston Bruins for Carson Cooper with both teams holding right of recall.
 December 12, 1926 – Gizzy Hart traded to Montreal by Detroit for cash.

See also
1926–27 NHL season

References

Montreal Canadiens seasons
Montreal
Montreal